Postcards from East Oceanside: Greatest Hits is Paula Cole's first compilation album. It also includes two new tracks, "Tomorrow I Will Be Yours" and "Postcards from East Oceanside".

Track listing
"I Am So Ordinary"
"Me"
"I Believe In Love"
"Where Have All the Cowboys Gone?"
"Amen"
"Feelin' Love"
"I Don't Want to Wait"
"God Is Watching"
"Carmen"
"Happy Home"
"Autumn Leaves"
"Saturn Girl"
"Hush, Hush, Hush" (feat. Peter Gabriel)
"Bethlehem"
"Tomorrow I Will Be Yours"
"Postcards from East Oceanside"

References

Paula Cole albums
2006 greatest hits albums
Rhino Entertainment compilation albums
Warner Records compilation albums